Sven Göran Svensson (8 March 1959 – 6 October 1995) was a Swedish discus thrower.   He represented Sweden at the 1987 World Championships in Athletics.  As a senior, he competed for Söderhamns IF, IF Göta and IF Elfsborg . He won national championships in 1982 and also took a total of four SM-silver. In 1985 he was suspended 18 months for doping.  At the age of 30, Svensson was "clean" of anabolic steroids. While competing for Brigham Young University he was the 1980 NCAA Champion.  After studies in the U.S., he settled there and became a U.S. citizen in 1988. However, he is buried on Norrala Cemetery in Söderhamn.

References

1959 births
1995 deaths
Swedish male discus throwers
Doping cases in athletics
Brigham Young University alumni